Spiel nicht mit den Schmuddelkindern (Do not play with the grubby kids) is a 1965 album by liedermacher (singer-songwriter) Franz Josef Degenhardt, named after the track of the same name. It was his second album, after Rumpelstilzchen. The songs also appeared as a 1969 book.  The title of the album and the song became a catchphrase, and the title song is regarded as Degenhardt's most successful work.

Themes 

The album is a collection of songs criticising the bourgeois society in Germany after World War II with sarcasm and surrealism. It anticipated the 1968 student movement in West Germany. The singer "with the piercing voice and the powerfully plucked guitar" criticised nuclear war, class-based society and the war in Vietnam. The title song became one of Degenhardt's best-known, in the style of a moritat. It tells the story of an upper-class boy who likes to play with workers' children, but is forced into an upper-class career to fulfil his parents' expectations.

Track listing 
 Spiel nicht mit den Schmuddelkindern
 Ein schönes Lied
 Deutscher Sonntag
 Auf der Espresso-Maschine
 Hochzeit
 Gelobtes Land
 Alte Freunde
 Wölfe mitten im Mai
 Der schwarze Mann
 Der Mann von nebenan
 Zwei und zwei
 Diesmal werd’ ich nicht
 Der, der meine Lieder singt

Reception 
The first line of "Spiel nicht mit den Schmuddelkindern" became a frequently quoted phrase. The song was included in the popular song collection Die Mundorgel in 1982.

In 2010, the album was ranked No. 42 among the 50 best German albums by a jury of the German edition of the Rolling Stone magazine, reasoning:

Reviewer Daniel Koch described the album as a moral portrait of the Federal Republic in the mid-60s, when the economy was successful (Wirtschaftswunder) but problems such as nuclear war, class differences and Vietnam were looming. Three years before the 1968 student movement in West Germany, Degenhardt tackled the upper class and its "only partially hidden Nazism", using wit and surreal poetry, with "the right images". The reviewer called the album both a historical document and a work that is still valid today. Degenhardt influenced generations of liedermacher, from Hannes Wader to Gisbert zu Knyphausen. The title song is regarded as Degenhardt's most successful work, an expression of opposition to the "bourgeois complacency and bigotry" ("bürgerliche Selbstgefälligkeit und Borniertheit") of the 1960s.

References

Further reading 
 Franz Josef Degenhardt: Spiel nicht mit den Schmuddelkindern: Balladen, Chansons, Grotesken, Lieder. Rowohlt, Reinbek 1969, 
 Franz Josef Degenhardt: Kommt an den Tisch unter Pflaumenbäumen. Rowohlt, Reinbek 1986, 
 Katharina Götsch: Linke Liedermacher. Limbus, Innsbruck 2007, pp. 60–64

External links 
 
 
 
 Kleinode deutschsprachiger Musik (29): Franz Josef Degenhardt – Deutscher Sonntag (1965) (in German) tantepop.de 2011

Chanson albums
1965 albums